Nigel Slinger (born 25 June 1937) is a Guyanese cricketer. He played in three first-class matches for British Guiana and Trinidad and Tobago in 1958/59 and 1959/60.

See also
 List of Guyanese representative cricketers

References

External links
 

1937 births
Living people
Guyanese cricketers
Guyana cricketers
Trinidad and Tobago cricketers
Sportspeople from Georgetown, Guyana